Electrolux can refer to:

 Aerus LLC, Formerly Electrolux USA, a North American manufacturer of vacuum cleaners that once sold Electrolux Group products.  
 Electrolux (The Electrolux Group), a Swedish manufacturer of appliances and vacuum cleaners.
 Electrolux addisoni, an electric ray fish of the genus Electrolux.